The 1994 Gent–Wevelgem was the 56th edition of the Gent–Wevelgem cycle race and was held on 6 April 1994. The race started in Ghent and finished in Wevelgem. The race was won by Wilfried Peeters of the GB–MG Maglificio team.

General classification

References

Gent–Wevelgem
1994 in road cycling
1994 in Belgian sport
April 1994 sports events in Europe